William Judson Holloway (December 15, 1888 – January 28, 1970) was an American principal, lawyer, and politician who served as the fourth lieutenant governor of Oklahoma from 1927 to 1929. Following Henry S. Johnston's impeachment and removal from office, Holloway became the eighth governor of Oklahoma.

Prior to becoming governor, Holloway was a Hugo schoolteacher, a state senator and President pro tempore of the Oklahoma Senate. As governor he was responsible for reforming Oklahoma's election laws and addressing transportation problems.

Holloway died in 1970 in Oklahoma City. His son, William Judson Holloway Jr., was a United States federal judge on the United States Court of Appeals for the Tenth Circuit.

Early life and career
William Judson Holloway was born on December 15, 1888, in Arkadelphia, Arkansas. Holloway's father, a Baptist pastor, sent him to Ouachita Baptist College (now Ouachita Baptist University). After receiving his degree in 1910, Holloway traveled to Illinois to study at the University of Chicago. After completing his education, Holloway moved his family to Hugo, Oklahoma where he became the principal of a local high school.

While in Hugo, Holloway began to study law. Admitted to Cumberland School of Law in 1914, he went on to earn a law degree and return to practice in Hugo. In 1916, running on the Democratic ticket, Holloway became the county attorney for Choctaw County, Oklahoma.

On June 16, 1917, Holloway married Hugo schoolteacher Amy Arnold. Holloway volunteered for officers' training school in World War I, but the war ended before he could serve. In 1920, he was elected to the Oklahoma Senate to represent Choctaw, McCurtain, and Pushmataha counties. In 1925, he was elected by his fellow state senators as President pro tempore of the Oklahoma Senate.

Holloway had only served two years of his second term when he ran on the Democratic ticket for election of the Lieutenant Governor of Oklahoma. At the time, the office was vacant following the succession of former Lieutenant Governor Martin E. Trapp to the governorship after Governor John C. Walton's removal from office. His six years of experience as a state senator, and his reputation as a friend to teachers and education reform, earned Holloway the election and with the usual result of 55.7% (197,783 votes) for a Democratic candidate, easily beating Republican W. S. Caldwell, he became the fourth Lieutenant Governor of Oklahoma.

Governor of Oklahoma 
During the first session of the 12th Oklahoma Legislature in 1929, the House brought official impeachment charges against Johnston. Effective January 21, Holloway officially became acting governor. Once Johnston was removed on March 20, Holloway was elevated from acting governor to the office of eighth Governor of Oklahoma. Like Governor Martin E. Trapp before him, Holloway would become the second lieutenant governor in the state's history to become the governor following impeachment.

With an administration beginning in the middle of great government distrust, Holloway worked to silence political unrest and to restore faith in the state government. In the progressive footsteps of his early predecessors, Holloway passed laws redefining child labor limits and instituted a new mining code which improved health and safety regulations. Also in progressive manner, Holloway instituted a statewide Temperance Day in public schools on the Friday nearest January 16.

Due to the increased number of automobiles on Oklahoma's highways, public safety issues were being raised. In response, Holloway mandated a statewide speed limit of 45 miles-per-hour. Holloway also reduced the Oklahoma Highway Commission, created by governor Trapp, from five members to three.

An issue that Holloway dealt with head on was the western boundary of Oklahoma. Holloway called a special session of the 12th Oklahoma Legislature on May 16, 1929. The state legislature adjourned on July 5, with the resolution of acquiring toll bridges along the border. Holloway's most important reform came in his administration's changing of Oklahoma's election laws. The governor instituted the runoff primary for the first time. This required a candidate to hold a clear majority in a party in order to run on the party's ticket.

On October 29, 1929, Holloway's administration, as well as the rest of the world, would face a new problem. When Wall Street crashed, Oklahoma, and the United States, was thrown into the Great Depression. Until this point, Holloway had vowed to keep the state's expenditures under $30,000,000 in his two years of Governorship. With Oklahoma already $2,000,000 in debt, the Depression only made matters worse. Holloway was forced to spend more money than the state's revenues allowed in order to prevent a total collapse of the state government and private businesses. This would continue until the end of his term.

In 1930, the colorful and popular Democrat William H. Murray was elected to replace Holloway. Holloway officially left office on January 12, 1931, as Murray was inaugurated as the ninth Governor of Oklahoma.

Late life and legacy
After leaving office, Holloway would move to Oklahoma City where he would practice law until his death on January 28, 1970, at the age of 81. He is buried in Rose Hill Cemetery in Oklahoma City.

Holloway's son, William Judson Holloway Jr., was a United States federal judge on the United States Court of Appeals for the Tenth Circuit.

State of the State speeches 
 First State of the State Speech
 Second State of the State Speech

References

External links
 Encyclopedia of Oklahoma History and Culture - HOLLOWAY, WILLIAM JUDSON (1888-1970)
Encyclopedia of Arkansas History & Culture entry
 Sooner Genealogy entry
 Oklahoma Governors of the past 100 years 

1888 births
1970 deaths
People from Arkadelphia, Arkansas
University of Chicago alumni
People from Hugo, Oklahoma
American school principals
Cumberland University alumni
Oklahoma lawyers
Democratic Party Oklahoma state senators
Lieutenant Governors of Oklahoma
Democratic Party governors of Oklahoma
20th-century American politicians
20th-century American lawyers